The siege of Varna (July–September 29, 1828) was a battle during the Russo-Turkish War, 1828–1829.

History 
Varna was held by the Ottoman army. An approach to Varna by Russian forces was first attempted on June 28, but the Russian avantgarde was met by significant Turkish forces, and the siege was postponed.

By the end of July, the Black Sea Fleet under the command of Aleksey Greig approached Varna and delivered the landing forces. In mid-August the Guards Corps arrived at Varna, with Emperor Nicholas I. The siege was put under the command of Adjutant General Menshikov, with total forces of 23,000 personnel and 170 artillery pieces against the 20,000 garrison of Varna. When Menshikov was wounded the siege was entrusted to General Field Marshal Mikhail Semyonovich Vorontsov.

In an attempt to relieve the siege of Varna, Omer Vrioni brought an army of 20,000 but was successfully held off. At the battle of Kurtepe the Russians under Prince Eugen of Württemberg attacked but they were defeated and retreated. However the Turks did not follow up this victory and waited 11 days at the place. In the meantime Varna capitulated.
Eventually Varna was taken with 6,900 prisoners and 140 artillery pieces. The town was surrendered by Yusuf Pasha.
However, the Russians suffered big losses during the summer-autumn campaign and withdrew from Varna and the Danube to resume the campaign in the following spring. The Russians had lost 6,000 men in the siege from battles and disease.

References

 Kersnovsky, Anton, History of the Russian Army, Belgrade, 1933–1936, reprinted by Golos, 1992-1994 .

Varna
Varna
Varna
History of Varna, Bulgaria